Rupak Sarmah is a Bharatiya Janata Party politician from Assam. He has been elected in Assam Legislative Assembly election in 2016 and 2021 from Nowgong constituency.

Sarmah is a businessman by profession and a cultural worker. He is the President of Alumni Association, Nowgong College, a college of Assam. He was born in Nagaon, Assam.

References 
4. BJP nominates Rupak Sharma for Nowgong constituency

Living people
Bharatiya Janata Party politicians from Assam
Assam MLAs 2016–2021
People from Morigaon district
1972 births
Assam MLAs 2021–2026